The Republic of China Army Band is a musical unit of the Republic of China Army used for state ceremonies and public duties, serving as one of the oldest and seniormost military bands in the Chinese National Armed Forces, being the second to the Symphonic Band of the Ministry of National Defense of the ROC. The band was founded on April 16, 1950 as a result of the reorganization of the Army Command on the basis of prior ensembles.

It is the main band that marches at official ceremonies and receptions for the high-ranking officials who recognize the Republic of China government that visit Taipei, which includes heads of state, heads of government, and diplomatic delegations. One of the band's main appearances is at the Double Ten Parade in October as part of the combined ROCAF massed bands. The army band, like other Taiwanese military bands are inspired by American and German military band traditions, with a notable aspect being the use of a whistle for commands, a tradition only found in United States military bands. The military band starks in contrast to the People's Liberation Army Band, which was also influenced in German and most of the Soviet/Russian traditions.

See also 
 Central Military Band of the People's Liberation Army of China
 People's Liberation Army Navy Band
 Hong Kong Police Band
 People's Armed Police Band
 Beijing Garrison Honor Guard Battalion

References

Military bands
Republic of China Army
1950 establishments in Taiwan
1950 establishments in China
Military units and formations established in 1950
Musical groups established in 1950